Torc Mountain, at , is the 329th–highest peak in Ireland on the Arderin list. It is a popular mountain for hill walkers as it has a stone or boarded path (using railway sleepers) from its base at Torc Waterfall to its summit, which has views of the Lakes of Killarney.  Torc Mountain is part of the Mangerton Mountain Group range in County Kerry, Ireland.

Naming 

The word Torc comes from the Irish translation of a "wild boar", and the area is associated with legends involving wild boars – Irish academic Paul Tempan notes that: "Wild boar is significant in Celtic mythology, being depicted on Celtic artefacts found in continental Europe, Ireland and Britain; it represents physical strength and heroic fighting skills".  One legend is of a man who was cursed by the Devil to spend each night transformed into a wild boar, but when his secret was revealed by a local farmer, he burst into flames and disappeared into the nearby Devil's Punchbowl on Mangerton Mountain from which the Owengarriff River emerged to hide the entrance to his cave beneath the Torc Waterfall.  There is also the story of how the legendary Irish warrior, Fionn MacCumhaill, killed a magical boar on Torc mountain with his golden spear.

Geography 
Torc Mountain is part of the Mangerton Mountain Group which is a massif to the south of Killarney that includes 26 other named peaks with a height above .  Torc sits in the north-west corner of the massif and immediately west of Torc Mountain is the subsidiary summit of Torc Mountain West Top .  Torc's height and prominence, qualifies it on the British Isles Marilyn classification, as well as the Arderin classification.

Hill walking 

The route can thus be completed without full hiking boots, and requires no special navigational skills.  

The summit of Torc has views of the Lakes of Killarney, the Black Valley, the MacGillycuddy's Reeks and Muckross House and grounds.  The route from the Torc Waterfall car-park (at ), to the summit of Torc Mountain and back is 8–kilometres and takes 3 hours.

Hill walkers can avoid the circa 100 steps of Torc Waterfall and start instead from the upper Torc Waterfall car-park (at 55 metres), to complete the shorter 7.5–kilometre hour 2.5–hour route to the summit of Torc Mountain, via the Old Kenmare Road, and back to the upper car-park.

The northerly views from the summit of Torc Mountain can be achieved by climbing the steep stone steps up the lower Cardiac Hill, which is half-way up the north facing slopes of Torc Mountain, and which can be accessed from the N71 Road, half a kilometre from the Torc Waterfall car-park.

Bibliography

See also

 Lists of mountains in Ireland
 List of mountains of the British Isles by height
 Torc Waterfall
 Mangerton Mountain Group
 The Black Valley

References

External links
MountainViews: The Irish Mountain Website, Torc Mountain
MountainViews: Irish Online Mountain Database
The Database of British and Irish Hills , the largest database of British Isles mountains ("DoBIH")
Hill Bagging UK & Ireland, the searchable interface for the DoBIH
Ordnance Survey Ireland ("OSI") Online Map Viewer
Logainm: Placenames Database of Ireland
 Torc Mountain Walking Route, Map and GPS information from the Activeme site

Marilyns of Ireland
Mountains and hills of County Kerry
Mountains under 1000 metres